Gerit Quealy is an American writer, editor, and actor.

She is the co-author of Wedding Flowers (2003) and Wedding Cakes and Flowers (2006), and an editor of Fifty Things to Do When You Turn Fifty (2005).

Quealy has also written for the Vows column of The New York Times, as well as the Style desk of the Times.

Quealy was formerly a Wilhelmina model and an associate editor of Flair magazine. From 1983 to 1985 (and briefly in 1987), she played Jacqueline Dubujak Novak on the ABC daytime serial Ryan's Hope.

Bibliography
 With Allison Kyle Leopold. Wedding Flowers. New York: Hearst, 2003.   
 With Kathleen Hackett and Allison Kyle Leopold. Wedding Cakes and Flowers. New York: Hearst, 2006.

As editor
 Ronnie Sellers, Gerit Quealy, Debra Gordon, Brian O'Connell, Sarah Mahoney and Allison Kyle Leopold. Fifty Things to Do When You Turn Fifty. Sellers Publishing, 2005.

See also
 Shakespeare Workout

References

External links
 

1960 births
Living people
Actresses from Chicago
American fashion journalists
American stage actresses
American soap opera actresses
American film actresses
The New York Times writers
American magazine editors
American book editors
Writers from Illinois
Shakespearean scholars
American women non-fiction writers
Women magazine editors